Hovea similis  is a species of flowering plant in the family Fabaceae and grows in New South Wales and Queensland. It is a shrub or small tree with hairy foliage and mauve and yellowish-green pea-like flowers.

Description
The leaf upper surface is dull to almost shiny, smooth, veined, rounded to blunt or rarely with a short point at the apex and lance-shaped stipules . The lower surface has dense orange-brown curled hairs with long, interspersed white hairs.

Taxonomy
Hovea similis was first formally described in 2001 by Ian R. Thompson in Australian Systematic Botany from specimens collected near the McPherson Range Queensland in 1990.

Distribution and habitat
This species of pea grows in coastal sand and inland in forests near the Queensland border and New South Wales south to Taree.

References

similis
Flora of New South Wales
Flora of Queensland
Fabales of Australia
Plants described in 2001